The Prophet's Paradise is a 1922 American silent drama film directed by Alan Crosland and starring Eugene O'Brien, Sigrid Holmquist, and Arthur Housman.

Synopsis
A young American in Istanbul meets the daughter of an archaeologist examining Byzantium ruins, and rescues her from a gang of slavers who have kidnapped her.

Cast
Eugene O'Brien as Howard Anderson 
 Sigrid Holmquist as Mary Talbot 
 Bigelow Cooper as Hassard 
 Arthur Housman as Kadir 
 Nora Booth as Nelda 
 Joseph Burke as John Talbot 
 Jack Hopkins as Krand

References

Bibliography
 Monaco, James. The Encyclopedia of Film. Perigee Books, 1991.

External links

1922 films
1922 drama films
Silent American drama films
Films directed by Alan Crosland
American silent feature films
1920s English-language films
American black-and-white films
Selznick Pictures films
Films set in Istanbul
1920s American films